The State I'm In is the first country music studio album from Leigh Nash. She released the project on September 18, 2015. Nash worked with producer Brendan Benson, in the production of this album.

Background
Nash worked with producer Brendan Benson, in the creation of this album. The album has a traditional country feel, and Nash cited country artists such as Willie Nelson, Patsy Cline and Jim Reeves as influences. The album a recurring theme of being homesick. A single, "Somebody's Yesterday", co-written with Gerry House, was released from the album.

The album debuted on Top Country Albums chart at No. 39, and No. 18 on the Heatseeker Albums chart, with 1,100 copies sold on its debut week.

Critical reception

Awarding the album five stars from Jesus Freak Hideout, Ryan Barbee states, "it's fresh, melancholy but hopeful, whimsical, and endearing."

Accolades

Track listing

Charts

References

2015 albums
Leigh Nash albums
Country albums by American artists